Behjerd-e Sofla (also Romanized as Behjerd-e Soflá; also known as Behjerd and Behjerd-e Pā’īn) is a village in Halil Rural District, in the Central District of Jiroft County, Kerman Province, Iran. At the 2006 census, its population was 455, in 102 families.

References 

Populated places in Jiroft County